Natalie Rose Harrison (born July 1, 1985) is a Canadian professional wrestler, better known by her ring name K. C. Spinelli.

Early life 
Harrison was born in Toronto, Ontario and grew up in Guelph, Ontario. She attended College Heights Secondary School in Guelph. A self-described tomboy, she took part in a diverse range of athletic pursuits, including ballet, gymnastics, horseback riding, baseball, hockey, ringette, karate, judo, mai tai kickboxing, and wrestling. As a competitive amateur wrestler in high school she was good enough to have reached the Ontario Federation of School Athletic Associations championships if she hadn't fractured her elbow. She studied carpentry in college.

Professional wrestling career 
In 2009, Harrison began training in professional wrestling under the likes of Artemis Spencer, Kenny Lush, Bomber Nelson Creed, and Nicole Matthews. Her debut match took place that same year, where she teamed up with Veronika Vice against Nicole Matthews and Enid Erkhart. Her main show debut was in 2010 against Tenille Dashwood. She adopted the ring name "K. C. Spinelli", derived from the character Ashley Spinelli from the television series Recess.

In 2011, Spinelli was selected to be a part of the World of Hurt television series, featuring Lance Storm as the show's lead trainer. Her success on the program earned her the opportunity to appear as one of the trainers on the show's second season, this time under the legendary Rowdy Roddy Piper. 

Spinelli made her first appearance in Impact Wrestling on the November 2, 2017 show where she was shown as part of a tag team match with Sienna against Rosemary and Allie at a Border City Wrestling show. The following week, another match from Border City Wrestling was shown - this one between Spinelli and Allie. On November 30, she was part of a triple threat match with Laurel Van Ness and Madison Rayne as part of a tournament for the Impact Knockouts Championship where she was pinned following an Unprettier by Van Ness. In mid-2018, Harrison began portraying the Undead Maid of Honor, a member of Su Yung's Undead Bridesmaids entourage. This Character is distinct and has no kayfabe relation to Spinelli.

In 2020, Spinelli began training at the Flatbacks Wrestling school under the tutelage of Shawn Spears and Tyler Breeze.

Personal life 
Harrison has stated that she considers herself a feminist, stating in one interview "I'd burn a bra, if I didn't need it."

Championships and accomplishments 

Acclaim Pro Wrestling
APW Women's Championship (1 time)
APW Tag Team Championship (1 time)
British Empire Wrestling
BEW Women's Championship (1 time, current)
 International Grand Prix (2018)
Crossfire Wrestling
CW Women's Championship (1 time)
Elite Canadian Championship Wrestling
ECCW Women's Championship (1 time)
 Pro Wrestling Illustrated
 Ranked No. 45 of the best 50 female singles wrestlers in the PWI Female 50 in 2016
Pure Wrestling Association
PWA Elite Women's Championship (1 time)
Rebelution Women’s Wrestling 
Rebelution World Championship (current)
Steel City Pro Wrestling
SCPW Women's Championship (1 time)
SMASH Wrestling
CANUSA Classic Gold Medallist** (with Team Canada) (1 time)

References

External links

 

1985 births
21st-century professional wrestlers
Canadian female professional wrestlers
Living people
Professional wrestlers from Toronto